The electoral district of Bendigo was an electorate of the Victorian Legislative Assembly in the Australian state of Victoria. Centred on the city of Bendigo, the district was formed when the electorates of Bendigo East and Bendigo West were merged into a single district in 1927. Bendigo was abolished in 1985 when it was once again split into separate East and West districts.

Members for Bendigo

Election results

See also
 Electoral district of Bendigo East
 Electoral district of Bendigo West

Former electoral districts of Victoria (Australia)
1927 establishments in Australia
1985 disestablishments in Australia